FEMB may refer to:
 N-acetylmuramoyl-L-alanyl-D-glutamyl-L-lysyl-(N6-triglycine)-D-alanyl-D-alanine-diphosphoundecaprenyl-N-acetylglucosamine:glycine glycyltransferase
 Front-end motherboard